Kevin Ford (born August 3, 1962) is an American former heavyweight professional boxer.

Amateur career
Ford is a native of Sacramento, California, graduating from Rio Linda High School, but he moved to Houston in 1987 to further his boxing career. He had a stellar amateur career, becoming the 1988 National Golden Gloves super heavyweight champion. Prior to the win, he lost to Riddick Bowe in 1988 Olympic Trials.

Professional career
Ford turned pro in 1989 and was undefeated in his first 9 bouts before losing to Tony Willis by TKO in 1990.  He then lost a decision to Joe Hipp in 1992 and again in 1993.  He retired later that year after a TKO loss to James Smith.

Professional boxing record

|-
|align="center" colspan=8|14 Wins (10 knockouts, 4 decisions), 4 Losses (2 knockouts, 2 decisions)
|-
| align="center" style="border-style: none none solid solid; background: #e3e3e3"|Result
| align="center" style="border-style: none none solid solid; background: #e3e3e3"|Record
| align="center" style="border-style: none none solid solid; background: #e3e3e3"|Opponent
| align="center" style="border-style: none none solid solid; background: #e3e3e3"|Type
| align="center" style="border-style: none none solid solid; background: #e3e3e3"|Round
| align="center" style="border-style: none none solid solid; background: #e3e3e3"|Date
| align="center" style="border-style: none none solid solid; background: #e3e3e3"|Location
| align="center" style="border-style: none none solid solid; background: #e3e3e3"|Notes
|-align=center
|Loss
|align=left|
|align=left| James Smith
|TKO
|9
|26/06/1993
|align=left| Atlantic City, New Jersey, U.S.
|align=left|
|-
|Loss
|
|align=left| Joe Hipp
|UD
|10
|03/04/1993
|align=left| Las Vegas, Nevada, U.S.
|align=left|
|-
|Win
|
|align=left| Keith McMurray
|TKO
|7
|27/02/1993
|align=left| Beijing, China
|align=left|
|-
|Win
|
|align=left| Terry Verners
|TKO
|1
|11/07/1992
|align=left| The Aladdin, Paradise, Nevada, U.S.
|align=left|
|-
|Win
|
|align=left| John Morton
|PTS
|8
|06/05/1992
|align=left| Bakersfield, California, U.S.
|align=left|
|-
|Loss
|
|align=left| Joe Hipp
|UD
|8
|01/02/1992
|align=left| Caesars Palace, Paradise, Nevada, U.S.
|align=left|
|-
|Win
|
|align=left| Lionel Butler
|PTS
|8
|29/04/1991
|align=left| Great Western Forum, Inglewood, California, U.S.
|align=left|
|-
|Win
|
|align=left| John Morton
|PTS
|6
|28/02/1991
|align=left| San Diego, California, U.S.
|align=left|
|-
|Loss
|
|align=left| Tony Willis
|TKO
|7
|23/04/1990
|align=left| Great Western Forum, Inglewood, California, U.S.
|align=left|
|-
|Win
|
|align=left| Sammy Speech
|KO
|1
|22/02/1990
|align=left| Civic Plaza, Phoenix, Arizona, U.S.
|align=left|
|-
|Win
|
|align=left| Richard Cade
|KO
|3
|13/02/1990
|align=left| Long Beach, California, U.S.
|align=left|
|-
|Win
|
|align=left| Jose Herrera
|KO
|2
|08/12/1989
|align=left| Richfield, Utah, U.S.
|align=left|
|-
|Win
|
|align=left| Steve Cortez
|KO
|1
|13/11/1989
|align=left| Great Western Forum, Inglewood, California, U.S.
|align=left|
|-
|Win
|
|align=left| Don Askew
|TKO
|1
|12/10/1989
|align=left| Richfield, Utah, U.S.
|align=left|
|-
|Win
|
|align=left| Dion Burgess
|KO
|2
|29/06/1989
|align=left| Del Mar, California, U.S.
|align=left|
|-
|Win
|
|align=left| Herman Pettigrew
|KO
|1
|05/06/1989
|align=left| Great Western Forum, Inglewood, California, U.S.
|align=left|
|-
|Win
|
|align=left| Craig Murray
|DQ
|1
|15/05/1989
|align=left| Great Western Forum, Inglewood, California, U.S.
|align=left|
|-
|Win
|
|align=left| Rocky Pepeli
|KO
|1
|28/02/1989
|align=left| Great Western Forum, Inglewood, California, U.S.
|align=left|
|}

References

External links
 

1962 births
Sportspeople from Sacramento, California
Heavyweight boxers
Living people
National Golden Gloves champions
American male boxers